Pospelovo is the name of several rural localities in Russia:
Pospelovo, Omsk Oblast, a village in Ayevsky Rural Okrug of Bolsheukovsky District in Omsk Oblast; 
Pospelovo, Republic of Tatarstan, a selo in Yelabuzhsky District of the Republic of Tatarstan